Pojeta Peak is a peak rising to about 1,500 m in the central part of Webers Peaks, 2 nautical miles (3.7 km) southeast of Bingham Peak, in the Heritage Range, Ellsworth Mountains, Antarctica. It was named by the Advisory Committee on Antarctic Names (US-ACAN) after John Pojeta, Jr., a United States Geological Survey (USGS) paleontologist from 1963 and a field party member and paleontologist with the United States Antarctic Research Program (USARP) Ellsworth Mountains Expedition of 1979–80.

See also
 Mountains in Antarctica

References

 

Ellsworth Mountains
Mountains of Ellsworth Land